San Giorgio di Pesaro frazione of Terre Roveresche , in the Province of Pesaro e Urbino in the Italian region Marche. It was a separate comune until 2017.

References

Former municipalities of the Marche